Anushka Manchanda aka Kiss Nuka (born 11 February 1984) is a singer, music producer, composer, creative entrepreneur, actor, activist, and former VJ of Indian origin. She came to prominence as a member of the Indipop girl group Viva!. Manchanda and the winner of Khatron ke khiladi 2 and one of the lead actors of the international award-winning film Angry Indian Goddesses. She announced she has adopted the artistic name Kiss Nuka – which stands for Natures Universal Kinectic Attention , with a new vision for a better world She is the music head of Ranveer Singh and Navzar Eranee’s music label IncInk Records along with her younger brother Shikhar Yuvraj Manchanda aka Rākhis.

Career
Anushka Manchanda stepped into playback singing in the Tamil film industry by singing the song "O Mahire" from the 2004 film Manmadhan under the direction of noted music composer Yuvan Shankar Raja. She later worked several times with him to create popular songs like "Thee Pidikka" (Arinthum Ariyamalum), "Kudakooli" (Kalvanin Kadhali), "Money Money" (Thimiru) and "Oh..Oh..Ennanamo" (Chennai 600028). In 2006 then, she got her first opportunity to sing for a Hindi film as well, which was the title song of the film Golmaal, composed by Vishal–Shekhar. This was followed by several other songs under other noted music composers as Anu Malik, Salim–Sulaiman, Pritam and Shankar–Ehsaan–Loy.
She has also done a cameo role in the Bollywood film Dulha Mil Gaya, for which she has sung three songs as well. She has also appeared in a reality show of MTV Pulsar Stunt Mania in year 2010.

She featured on a track by Akcent in 'I am Sorry', which went to high critical acclaim and collaborated with Don't Give Up producer Chicane.

Anushka is one of the lead actors in the film Angry Indian Goddesses, a film by award-winning director Pan Nalin (https://en.wikipedia.org/wiki/Pan_Nalin) (Samsara). The film debuted at the Toronto Film Festival (https://en.wikipedia.org/wiki/Toronto_International_Film_Festival) where it won the runner up for the Audience Choice Award. The film was dubbed in 79 languages and went on to win at international film festivals like Rome Film Festival and Hof Film Festival.

She has appeared in several music videos, such as Queen of My Castle for the brand Nexa, The Little Things You Do with Mikey Mc Cleary.  Lay You Down for producer Nanok, and  "What would you do?" an advertisement for Grey's Anatomy reruns on Star World. She has a successful career in Bollywood. Her song "Dum Maro Dum" in the film "Dum Maro Dum" gained immense popularity. She has also sung “Ek Main Hun Aur Ek Tu” from the film Ek Main Aur Ekk Tu, "Apna Har Din Aise Jiyo" in "Golmaal 3". In 2013, she sang the remix version of 1991 hit song (originally sung by Kavita Krisnamurthy in the film Chalbaaz) "Na jaane kahan se aya hai" featuring Neeraj Shridhar. The song was so popular that it topped the Indian topchart for more than two months. The song is picturised on Chitrangada Singh and Prachi Desai and was used in the film "I, Me Aur Main" She recently was seen as a guest on the show Son of Abish. Her music video as Kiss Nuka - Don’t Be Afraid won the award for Best Concept and Best Director at the 17th Independent Music Awards in New York. She recently launched I am Seeking, a brand that focuses on spiritual healing via music and art. Anushka has turned director with her latest releases as Kiss Nuka - Ayo Burn  Kashmir and the Mahamrityunjay album.

Kiss Nuka is also the first independent music artist to release her track “Kashmir”  in Dolby Atmos.

Viva (2002-2004)

When Anushka was a part of the show Coke [V] Pop stars, she was trained under the likes of  Manish Malhotra, Bosco-Caesar, Shaimak Davar, and Noyonika Chaterjee. The band took the country by storm and became one of the highest trp reality shows on television. As Viva she worked with Javed Akhtar, Salim–Sulaiman, Shankar Ehsan Loy, Sandeep Chowta, Raju Singh, Shantanu Moitra, Ashu Dhruv.

Their first album that was sold, went platinum. 60,000 people were there for their first ever concert. They also got an opportunity to sing for AR Rehman.

For the second album of Viva. Viva Reloaded, Anushka composed a track on the piano. The song was ‘Yeh Pyar Nahi Toh Kya Hain’ to which the lyrics were written by Neha Bhasin and Anushka Manchanda.

Due to mutual differences the band split in 2004.

Channel V - 2004- 2006

After Viva split, Anushka started working as a VJ on Channel V. She was a host for a travel show called V on The Run with Purab Kohli and Sarah Jane Dias where they travelled around India. She hosted shows like Launchpad, Hotline, and Jukebox.

She left channel V in 2006 after the release of her song Golmaal in the film Golmaal.

Playback: 2006-2019

BOLLYWOOD: Anushka took the Bollywood music industry by storm, with her very first track Golmaal going platinum. Her first Telugu and Tamil tracks Mila Mila and Thee Pidikke were superhits. She has worked with music directors Vishal–Shekhar, Shanker Ehsaan Loy, Salim Suleiman, Yuvan Shankar,  Amit Trivedi, Haris Jairaj, Pritam, Sachin–Jigar. She won the Stardust Award for New Musical Sensation in 2008.

She has also sung jingles for Radio stations like Radio Mirchi and Ishq FM.

Voice overs and Jingeles: 2006–Present

Anushka started being hired as a voice over artist. She learned on the job as she became the voice behind brands like Vodafone, Levi's, Dove, Benetton, Nivea, Vaseline, Manforce, Godrej, Sony, Titan, Lakme, and Blackberry.

Acting Work: 2015

Anushka acted in a film called Angry Indian Goddesses. Directed by Pan Nalin (Director of Samsara) with the cast of Sandhya Mridul, Sarah Jane Dias, Rajshri Deshpande, Tannishtha Chatterjee.

Angry Indian Goddesses, touted as India's first female buddy film, is an 2015 drama feature film showcased in more than a Dozen film festivals across the world, it won the Prestigious People's Choice Award (The Oscar Predictor) at the Toronto International Film Festival 2015 and won audience awards in premium festivals including Rome, Zurich and many others. It was picked up for global sales by Mongrel International (Canada) and has sold theatrically to over 67 countries.

List of film festivals:

 GROLSCH PEOPLE'S CHOICE AWARD.
 Rome Film Fest (2015)
 Likho Awards (2015)
 South Asian Film Festival of Montréal (2016)
 Side by Side LGBT International Film Festival (2016)
 Inside Out LGBT Film Festival (2016)
 Sydney Film Festival (2016)
 Pendolino Technical Awards (2016) 
 Indian Film Festival of Los Angeles (2016)
 Pandolin Technical Awards (Angry Indian Goddesses won Best Direction & Best Casting & Ensemble Cast at Pandolin Technical Awards 2016.)
 The NYC LGBT Film Festival (2017)
 Athena Film Festival (2017)
 Mardi Gras Film Festival (2017)
 FUSION LGBT PEOPLE OF COLOR FILM FESTIVAL (2017)
 Zurich Film Festival
 and also won People's choice award at Rome Film Fest and Hoff Film Fest.

During the release of the film in 2016, Anushka toured 18 German cities like  Berlin,  Hamburg, Stuttgart, Koln with the rest of the cast. The actors also went to Switzerland, Spain, Zurich, Madrid, and Lisbon. It was globally distributed by Mongrel International in more than 66 countries.

Angry Indian Goddesses was one of the first Indian films licensed by Netflix International and distributed digitally. The film premiered in India at the MAMI film festival and received critical acclaim for being a brutally honest portrayal of women in India. Produced by Jungle Book Entertainment in India and co-produced by One Two Films in Germany, the film also features a song called Zindagi written, composed, and performed by Anushka.

Media Coverage of the film:

 Feature : 'Angry Indian Goddesses'
 Fighting Back
 Angry Indian Goddesses: Feminist buddy pic builds to startling conclusion
 ‘Angry Indian Goddesses’ Review: Bollywood Sex and the City
 Cannes: Chantal Chateauneuf, Georgia Poivre Win Cannes Film Market’s Cinando BestSeller Award
 This Indian film is going to be the highlight of Sydney Film Festival
 ‘Angry Indian Goddesses’ Wins Rome Film Fest’s People’s Choice Award
 'Angry Indian Goddesses' closes key territory
 Toronto: European Distributors Bow to ‘Angry Indian Goddesses’ (EXCLUSIVE)
 Watch the tale of seven women in Angry Indian Goddesses: India's first female buddy film ever
 WATCH: Trailer Of 'Angry Indian Goddesses', India's First All-Women Buddy Movie
 Déesses indiennes en colère », portrait de femmes modernes vu par son réalisateur
 10 bonnes raisons d'idolâtrer les Déesses indiennes en colère
 Angry Indian Goddesses Premiere - TIFF 2015 
 IFFLA 2016 | SARAH-JANE DIAS | ANGRY INDIAN GODDESSES
 IFFLA 2016 | GAURAV DHINGRA | ANGRY INDIAN GODESSES
 AIG at Los Angeles
 Los Angeles feature the Goddesses

In 2016 Anushka starred in a music video with Monica Dogra about two women in love, for producer Nanok’s song Lay You Down. The music video was edited by Anushka and was heralded as a clutter-breaking, bold statement and sent ripples through the music industry.

Anushka is currently signed on to Das Imperium Talent Agency in Berlin.

LIVE PERFORMANCE : 2006–present

Stage is a huge aspect of Anushka's life as a musician and she spends season time touring the country and different parts of the world. She is known for her high energy performances, often jumping off stage, climbing onto and over barricades to interact with her audience, giving traditional Bollywood performances a heavy dose of rock and roll. She has won the Events FAQ award for best performer and has performed all over the world for colleges like:

 Ramjas College Delhi
 NIT Jamshedpur
 CET Bhubaneshwar
 Cambridge university of Technology
 Techno College- Kolkata
 Tezpur University
 SRM University Chennai
 Tula University

and for brands like:

 Miss Diva
 Sketchers
 XS Energy Drink India Tour
 Nike
 Wipro Marathon 
 Kala Ghoda Festival
 HSBC Family Day
 Magic 106.4 FM

She uses the hashtag #discogoeslive on social media to mark her live performances. Anushka has also performed with The Bartender, an act created by Mikey McCleary.

Music Production: 2015–Present

With a successful career in films, she wanted to build a career as an independent artist. (She came together as an electro pop group in 2012 with Indie band Pentagram drummer and Filmmaker Shiraz Bhattacharya, Producer and Hypnotribe member Abhijit Nalani, Johan Pies, Guitarist, Pozy Dhar band called Shkabang. The band released a track and music video called Crazy and toured. The band disbanded 2 years later.)

Keen on expanding her skillset and taking her love for sound a step further, Anushka went to New York in the summer of 2015 for 3 months to study music production from the electronic music school Dubspot. There she learned to use the production software Logic Pro, along with her brother Shikhar Yuvraj Manchanda aka Rākhis who did a mix and master course there.

In 2016, Shikhar and Anushka produced the music for Jack and Jones which featured  Ranveer Singh as a rapper. They  followed it up in 2017 with a second music video for the same brand with Ranveer. In the following years they produced music for brands like like Reebok, JBL, Jack & Jones, NBA, Chandon and Swiss Tourism at their studios The Beast India Company.

In 2019, Anushka and Shikhar worked on NBA's show Hoop Nation. They did the sound design for the documentary series and produced the music videos for all 4 episodes as well as the Trailer. In 2019 Anushka and Shikhar came on board as the music heads for Ranveer Singh and Navzar Eranee's music label IncInk Records, where they produced music for the artists, and shaped the sonic identity of the label.

Most recently, they produced track for a Netflix film directed by Vikramaditya Motwane AK vs AK with a veteran actor Anil Kapoor as a rap artist for the first time which has 130,512 views.

Kiss Nuka: 2018–Present

In 2018, Anushka launched Kiss Nuka, her alter ego, with the electro pop song, Don't be Afraid, a music video conceptualized by her and Navzar Eranee. The music video was in top 10 music videos of 2018 by Rolling Stones and Homegrown.

The Music video also won at 17th Independent Music Awards in New York for best concept and best direction. The music was produced, edited and performed by Anushka as Kiss Nuka. With the formation of IncInk, Kiss Nuka also produced music for rap artists Kaam Bhaari and Spitfire. Mohabbat, produced by Kiss Nuka and Rākhis (Shikhar Yuvraj Manchanda), was nominated for Europe Music Awards. Kiss Nuka also produced tracks like Mehfil E Hiphop and Black, and the Mohabbat bhand mix for which she also edited and created a music video.

In Jan 2020, she released her 2nd official music video as Kiss Nuka on IncInk Records featuring rapper Kaam Bhaari, a scathing socio-political music piece on the current state of affairs. The song got a lot of critical acclaim. This was the first music video that Kiss Nuka directed as well as edited, besides producing and performing the song. The song was selected in the Silver Screenings category at the Berlin Video Music Awards .

In November 2020, Kiss Nuka released Kashmir featuring Khalid Ahmed from Parvaaz and award-winning Rabab player Sufiyan Malik. A piece dedicated to the beauty of Kashmir and its conservation, the video was directed, edited and produced by Kiss Nuka and was 5 years in the making.

Kiss Nuka is the first independent artist to work with Dolby to produce Kashmir in Dolby Atmos.

In December 2020, international music ticketing platform and artist discovery Dice FM launched in India with Kiss Nuka as the only female artist to perform.

Kiss Nuka created, directed, produced and edited a virtual performance piece called Shed My Skin, for which she received rave reviews.

In March 2021, Kiss Nuka was amongst the first few artists who adopted the digital world with her conceptualized live performance multi-media starring various artists, at the launch of Dice.Fm in India.

Kiss Nuka launched her brand I am Seeking, through which she released the Mahamrityunjay Mantra album.

I am Seeking - 2021

In 2021, Kiss Nuka launched I Am Seeking, a brand based on spiritual healing. Anushka's mother Tarmindar Manchanda (Terry Manchanda) who is a well known authority on crystals and their uses in Spiritual healing, has been a practicing spiritual healer, reiki, quantum healing for 30 years. I am Seeking is a brand under which Kiss Nuka will be releasing music, products and experiences related spiritual healing.

On the occasion of Mahashivratri, Kiss Nuka released an album called Mahamrityunjay Mantra as a part of I am Seeking.

The album has been produced and performed by Kiss Nuka and consists of the Mahamrityunjay mantra, a 45-minute version with 108 repetitions of the mantra, and multilingual, sound-designed audiobooks (Hindi / English) explaining the origins Mahamrityunjay Mantra and its effects on us. Kiss Nuka also produced, directed, edited as well as graded the videos for the album.

Kiss Nuka launched her first product under I am Seeking..a 108 bead rosary made out of crystals meant for healing.

Editing – 2016–Present

Anushka's first editing job was on a music video directed by Navzar Eranee for music producer Nanok.  The music video had a huge cultural impact.

Anushka is a self taught editor, and has edited music videos like Don't Hold Back for Jack and Jones, advertisements  for Zivame and Thumbs Up, and music videos for IncInk Records like Zeher, Paathshala, Mohabbat,/ bhand mix (Bhand mix also Directed) and Sangeet. As Kiss Nuka, Anushka edits all her own videos including Ayo Burn, Kashmir, Mahamrityunjay and Don't Be Afraid.

IncInk Records - 2019–Present

The first time Shikhar, Anushka and Ranveer and Navzar worked together was on the Jack and Jones music video Don't Be Afraid. The video featured Ranveer Singh rapping, was directed by Navzar, edited by Anushka,  and Shikhar and Anushka produced the music for it. a contest was announced for budding rappers.

The same crew came together in 2017 to create a music video with the winning rappers from the contest. They selected four rappers to be a part of Don't Hold Back 2.

In 2019, Navzar Eranee and Ranveer Singh officially  launched the independent music label called IncInk  Records where Kiss Nuka and Rākhis became the music heads, launching the very same 4 rappers they had found in 2017. Anushka worked on grooming, training and styling the young rappers for the press launch on 29 March 2019. The label went on to produce and launch rappers Kaam Bhaari, Spitfire and Slow Cheeta. IncInk Records worked with the deaf community to produce ISL videos with Acciomango for the songs Vartalaap, Mehfil-e-HipHop and Shwapon,  and used their platform to petition for ISL to be legally recognized as a language in India.

IncInk was also picked out of India by British electronic dance and clubbing media brand and magazine MixMag to feature on their docu-series called Kings of Culture.

ART & ACTIVISM : 2018 TO PRESENT

Anushka/Kiss Nuka has been an activist for animal rights, the environment and women's right, Censorship and sustainability through her photo essays like Censor This, Attention and Grow. Through her photo series Mute, she talks about poaching. Don't Be Afraid talks about the life and death of man and his connection to nature, Ayo Burn is a scathing socio-political song, and Kashmir was created to celebrate the region's beauty and its conservation.

She regularly participates in ground marches and promotes sustainable, cruelty free, vegan products. She is a supporter of organizations like Fridays For Future, Million Dollar Vegan, and Save Aarey. She was a moderator at the first Vegan India Conference in 2019. She often works with animal welfare NGO World For All based in Mumbai.

FASHION:

Featuring on multiple best dressed lists for Cosmopolitan, GQ, Harper's Bazaar, and Elle over the years, Anushka's individualistic style and interest in experimentation has made her a household name with fashion labels across the country. She promotes plant-based beauty products and sustainable fashion through her choices and associations. She has been seen on the red carpet in brands like Malini Ramani, Gaurav Gupta, Atsu, Amit Agarwal, Gauri Nainika,  Human, Rohit and Rahul Gandhi, Shivan and Narresh, Nikhil Thampi.

PRESS: 2002 TO PRESENT

Over the years, Anushka has been seen on the covers of magazines like Rolling Stone, Cosmopolitan, Maxim, L’Officiel, Femina.

AWARDS

Anushka won the Zee Cine Award for New singing Sensation in 2008. As Kiss Kiss Nuka, she won both Best Concept and Best Director for her first music video at the 17th Independent Music Awards in New York. In 2021 Kiss Kiss Nuka's music video Ayo Burn was nominated at the Berlin Music Video Fest.

Filmography

Discography

References

External links

 Official website

 

1984 births
Living people
Indian women playback singers
Tamil playback singers
Bollywood playback singers
Telugu playback singers
Indian women pop singers
21st-century Indian singers
Women musicians from Delhi
Singers from Delhi
21st-century Indian women singers
Fear Factor: Khatron Ke Khiladi participants
Indian VJs (media personalities)